Malcolm Roy "Kela" Smith  (10 April 1943 – 5 April 2021) was a businessman, aviator and politician in Papua New Guinea.

Biography
Smith was born in London, England in 1943, and emigrated to Australia as a child. He joined the Australian Army Aviation corps, and served as a pilot with the 161st Independent Reconnaissance Flight in the Vietnam War for which he was awarded the Distinguished Flying Cross. In 1969, Smith was posted to Papua New Guinea where he remained permanently, founding the aviation company Pacific Helicopters PNG and owning a shopping centre and hotel in Goroka.

Smith was appointed a Member of the Order of the British Empire (MBE) in the 1993 Birthday Honours for services to the community and civil aviation, and a Companion of the Order of St Michael and St George (CMG) in the 2006 Birthday Honours for services to primary industry and the environment.

He served as the Governor of Eastern Highlands Province from 2002–2012. Smith also served as a member of the National Parliament of Papua New Guinea for the United Resources Party from 2003–2012. He died at age 77 from complications of COVID-19 while under treatment in the intensive care unit at Redcliffe Hospital in Queensland, Australia.

References

1943 births
2021 deaths
Governors of Eastern Highlands Province
Members of the National Parliament of Papua New Guinea
United Resources Party politicians
Papua New Guinea Party politicians
English emigrants to Australia
Australian emigrants to Papua New Guinea
Australian military personnel of the Vietnam War
Australian recipients of the Distinguished Flying Cross (United Kingdom)
Companions of the Order of St Michael and St George
Members of the Order of the British Empire
Deaths from the COVID-19 pandemic in Australia